Marcia Hovey-Wright is a Democratic politician from Michigan who served in the Michigan House of Representatives.

Hovey-Wright is a psychotherapist and a licensed social worker. She has been involved in numerous community organizations and boards, including her neighborhood association and parent-teacher organization.

References

1946 births
Living people
Democratic Party members of the Michigan House of Representatives
People from Montclair, New Jersey
People from Muskegon, Michigan
Women state legislators in Michigan
Pennsylvania State University College of Health and Human Development alumni
Aquinas College (Michigan) alumni
University of Michigan School of Social Work alumni
American psychotherapists
21st-century American politicians
21st-century American women politicians